Kim Dae-sub (born 30 June 1981) is a South Korean professional golfer.

Kim played on the Korean Tour where he won nine times. He won the Korea Open as a 17-year-old amateur in 1998 and won it again in 2001 at which point he turned professional. He won the event a third time in 2012.

Professional wins (9)

Asian Tour wins (2)

1Co-sanctioned by the Korean Tour

OneAsia Tour wins (1)

1Co-sanctioned by the Korean Tour

Korean Tour wins (9)

1Co-sanctioned by the Asian Tour
2Co-sanctioned by the OneAsia Tour

Team appearances
Amateur
Eisenhower Trophy (representing South Korea): 1998, 2000

Professional
World Cup (representing South Korea): 2004

References

External links

South Korean male golfers
Golfers at the 1998 Asian Games
Asian Games competitors for South Korea
1981 births
Living people